Henry Beecher may refer to:
Henry K. Beecher, American anesthesiologist and medical ethicist
Henry Ward Beecher, American Congregationalist clergyman